Sally Ann Mene (née Flynn) is a former discus and javelin thrower from New Zealand.

Sally competed in both the 1970 British Commonwealth Games and the 1974 British Commonwealth Games.

Sally Flynn married Mene Mene, a decathlete, in 1970 and they had three children together. Their son Chris Mene is also a discus thrower, and their daughter Bernice Mene was captain of the New Zealand netball team, the Silver ferns. Nathan Mene represented New Zealand in U20 Basketball and also Samoa at the Commonwealth Games in Kuala Lumpur in the High Jump.
Sally and Mene Mene have seven grandchildren.

References

Living people
Athletes (track and field) at the 1974 British Commonwealth Games
Athletes (track and field) at the 1970 British Commonwealth Games
New Zealand female discus throwers
New Zealand female javelin throwers
Year of birth missing (living people)
Commonwealth Games competitors for New Zealand